Culzean Castle (see yogh) is a castle overlooking the Firth of Clyde, near Maybole, Carrick, in South Ayrshire, on the west coast of Scotland. It is the former home of the Marquess of Ailsa, the chief of Clan Kennedy, but is now owned by the National Trust for Scotland. The clifftop castle lies within the Culzean Castle Country Park and is opened to the public. 
From 1972 until 2015, an illustration of the castle was featured on the reverse side of five pound notes issued by the Royal Bank of Scotland.

As of 2021, the castle was available for rent.

History 
Culzean Castle was constructed as an L-plan castle by order of the 10th Earl of Cassilis. He instructed the architect Robert Adam to rebuild a previous, but more basic, structure into a fine country house to be the seat of his earldom. The castle was built in stages between 1777 and 1792. It incorporates a large drum tower with a circular saloon inside (which overlooks the sea), a grand oval staircase and a suite of well-appointed apartments.

The castle was the venue, on 14 November 1817, when the 1st Marquess of Ailsa's daughter, Margaret Radclyffe Livingstone Eyre, married Thomas, Viscount Kynnaird. Margaret would become a noted philanthropist.

In 1945, the Kennedy family gave the castle and its grounds to the National Trust for Scotland (thus avoiding inheritance tax). In doing so, they stipulated that the apartment at the top of the castle be given to General of the Army Dwight D. Eisenhower in recognition of his role as Supreme Commander of the Allied Forces in Europe during the Second World War. The General first visited Culzean Castle in 1946 and stayed there four times, including once while President of the United States.

The Ayrshire (Earl of Carrick's Own) Yeomanry, a British Yeomanry cavalry regiment, was formed by the Earl of Cassillis at Culzean Castle in about 1794. On 24 June 1961, the regiment returned to the castle to be presented with its first guidon by General Sir Horatius Murray, KBE, CB, DSO.

The castle re-opened in April 2011 after a refurbishment funded by a gift in the will of American millionaire William Lindsay to the National Trust for Scotland. Lindsay,  who had never visited Scotland, requested that a significant portion of his $4 million go towards Culzean. Lindsay was reportedly interested in Eisenhower's holidays at the castle.

Culzean Castle received 333,965 visitors in 2019.

Features 

The armoury contains a propeller from a plane flown by Leefe Robinson when he shot down a German airship north of London in 1916.

To the north of the castle is a bay containing the Gas House, which provided town gas for the castle up until 1940. This group of buildings consists of the gas manager's house (now containing an exhibition on William Murdoch), the Retort House and the remains of the gasometer.

There are sea caves beneath the castle which are currently not open generally, but are open for tours throughout the summer.

The castle grounds include a walled garden, which is built on the site of the home of a former slave owned by the Kennedy family, Scipio Kennedy.

Ghosts
The castle is reputed to be home to at least seven ghosts, including a piper and a servant girl.

Film and television appearances
Culzean Castle is used as the castle of Lord Summerisle (played by Christopher Lee) in the 1973 cult film The Wicker Man. The scenes here were filmed between October and November 1972.
Culzean Castle featured in the 1997 PBS documentary series Castles of Scotland.
Culzean Castle and Country Park featured in the 2001 Bollywood film Pyaar Ishq Aur Mohabbat.
The Most Haunted team led by Yvette Fielding, Karl Beattie and medium Derek Acorah explored Culzean Castle's paranormal stories and reported sightings of ghosts for an episode of the first series, broadcast on Living TV in 2002.
The BBC TV Coast programme visited in series 2 episode 3 first shown in November 2009.
Culzean Castle appeared on the programme The Little Couple from TLC, where the family visited the castle on the Series 9 pilot episode in 2016.
It was the location for two episodes of BBC One’s Antiques Roadshow filmed in 2020 and transmitted in February and April 2021.

Gallery

See also
 Banknotes of Scotland (featured on design)

References

External links 

Culzean Castle – visitor information at the NTS website.
Papers of the National Trust of Scotland (Dwight D. Eisenhower's Culzean Castle apartment), Dwight D. Eisenhower Presidential Library
Engraving of Cullean castle by James Fittler in the digitised copy of Scotia Depicta, or the antiquities, castles, public buildings, noblemen and gentlemen's seats, cities, towns and picturesque scenery of Scotland, 1804 at National Library of Scotland
Video footage of the Culzean Coal Gas Works
Video footage of the Culzean caves

Castles in South Ayrshire
Category A listed buildings in South Ayrshire
Listed castles in Scotland
Reportedly haunted locations in Scotland
Inventory of Gardens and Designed Landscapes
Robert Adam buildings
National Trust for Scotland properties
Gardens in South Ayrshire
Historic house museums in South Ayrshire
Country houses in South Ayrshire
Clan Kennedy
Firth of Clyde